Thai horror refers to horror films produced in the Thai film industry. Thai folklore and beliefs in ghosts have influenced its horror cinema. Horror is among the most popular genres in Thai cinema, and its output has attracted recognition internationally. Pee Mak, a 2013 comedy horror film, is the most commercially successful Thai film of all time.

History 

Nang Nak (1999) has been described as a key part of "Thai New Wave". Shutter (2004) was critically acclaimed and commercially successful locally and internationally. Shutter was successful in Malaysia, Singapore, the Philippines and Brazil, and was remade in the United States and in India. Pee Mak (2013), a comedy horror, became the highest-grossing Thai film of all time upon its release. The Medium (2021), a Thai-South Korean co-production, was awarded Best Film at the 25th Bucheon International Fantastic Film Festival and was the Thai submission for the Academy Award for Best International Feature Film in its year of release, but was not nominated.

Notable films 

 Mae Nak Phra Khanong (1958)
 Krasue Sao (1973)
 Crocodile (1980)
 303 Fear Faith Revenge (1998)
 Nang Nak (1999)
 Bangkok Haunted (2001)
 999-9999 (2002)
 Buppah Rahtree (2003)
 House of Ghosts (2004)
 SARS Wars (2004)
 Shutter (2004)
 Art of the Devil (2004)
 Art of the Devil 2 (2005)
 Dorm (2006)
 La-Tha-Pii (2006)
 Krasue Valentine (2006)
 Coming Soon (2008)
 Art of the Devil 3 (2008)
 Meat Grinder (2009)
 Laddaland (2011)
 Pee Mak (2013)
 Inhuman Kiss (2019)
 Ghost Lab (2021)
 The Medium (2021)

Notable directors 
 Nonzee Nimibutr
Sompote Sands
Yuthlert Sippapak
Banjong Pisanthanakun

See also 

 Cinema of Thailand
 Folk horror
Ghosts in Thai culture
Cambodian horror films

References